Pyrgotis plinthoglypta is a species of moth of the family Tortricidae. It is endemic to New Zealand and is found throughout the whole country. The preferred habitat of this species is native forest. The larvae of this species feeds on rimu leaves from under a silken web. It pupates in loose cocoons amongst rimu foliage. Adults are on the wing from October to May and are night flying. They are attracted to light and can be collected by beating their host tree. The adult insect resembles a small dried fragment of rimu foliage when at rest.

Taxonomy
This species was first described by Edward Meyrick in 1892 using a specimen collected in Wellington by George Hudson. George Hudson, in 1928, discussed and illustrated this species in his book The butterflies and moths of New Zealand under the name Capua plinthoglypta. In 1988 J. S. Dugdale confirmed that this species is in the genus Pyrgotis. The male holotype specimen is held at the Natural History Museum, London.

Description 
The adult of this species was described by Edward Meyrick as follows: 
The wing markings of this species do not tend to vary.

The larva of this species has been described by George Hudson as follows:

Distribution 
This species is endemic to New Zealand and is found throughout the country. It is regarded as being common.

Behaviour 
The larvae of this species lives underneath silken webs amongst the leaves of rimu trees. They pupate in a loose cocoons created from silk and frass amongst the leaves of its host tree. Adults are on the wing from October to May. They are night flying moths and are attracted to light. When resting the adult insect resembles a small dried fragment of rimu foliage.

Habitat and host plant 

This species inhabits native forests. The larvae of this species feeds on rimu.

References

Moths described in 1892
Archipini
Moths of New Zealand
Endemic fauna of New Zealand
Taxa named by Edward Meyrick
Endemic moths of New Zealand